Frisell is a surname. Notable people with the surname include:

Bill Frisell (born 1951), American guitarist and composer
Erik Frisell (1889–1944), Swedish track and field athlete who competed in the 1912 Summer Olympics
Fraser Frisell (1774–1846), British essayist
Hjalmar Frisell (1880–1967), Swedish sports shooter who competed in the 1912 Summer Olympics

de:Frisell